was a railway station on the Yamada Line in Morioka, Iwate, Japan, operated by East Japan Railway Company (JR East). Opened in 1928, the station closed in March 2016.

Lines

Station layout
Asagishi Station has a single side platform serving traffic in both directions. The station is unstaffed.

Services

By late 2013, the station was normally served by a total of just five services daily, but from January until 15 March 2013, no trains stopped at this station during the winter period.

Adjacent stations

History
Asagishi Station opened on 25 September 1928. With the privatization of Japanese National Railways (JNR) on 1 April 1987, the station came under the control of JR East.

Closure
In August 2015, JR East notified the city of Morioka that it was considering closing Asagashi and Ōshida Station on the Yamada Line, possibly by March 2016, due to low patronage. In December 2015, JR East announced that it would be formally closing the station from the start of the following timetable revision.

The station closed following the last day of services on 25 March 2016.

Passenger statistics
, the station was used by an average of just 0.3 passengers daily (boarding passengers only).

Surrounding area
The station was situated in a remote area location with just two households living within a radius of 2.5 km.

See also
 List of railway stations in Japan

References

External links

 JR East station information 
 JR East December news release announcing the station's closure 

Stations of East Japan Railway Company
Railway stations in Iwate Prefecture
Yamada Line (JR East)
Railway stations in Japan opened in 1928
Morioka, Iwate
Railway stations closed in 2016
2016 disestablishments in Japan